Psara obscuralis, the obscure psara moth, is a moth of the family Crambidae. It is found in North America, where it has been recorded from Maryland to Florida, west to Texas and Illinois. In the south, the range extends to Central America, where it has been recorded from Mexico and Costa Rica.

The wingspan is about 23 mm. The forewings are dull yellowish to brown with dark antemedial and postmedial lines and a dark rectangular reniform spot. There is light brownish shading in the subterminal area. The hindwings are similar to the forewings in colour and markings, but lack an antemedial line and are paler toward the base. Adults are on wing from May to September.

The larvae feed on Petiveria alliacea.

References

Moths described in 1863
Spilomelinae